is a railway station in Nagata-ku, Kobe, Hyōgo Prefecture, Japan. The name is derived from the nearby Nagata Shrine.

Lines
Kobe Municipal Subway
Seishin-Yamate Line (S08)
Hanshin Railway
Kobe Kosoku Line - Kosoku Nagata Station

Railway stations in Hyōgo Prefecture
Stations of Kobe Municipal Subway
Railway stations in Japan opened in 1983